The 2020 Christy Ring Cup was the 16th staging of the Christy Ring Cup hurling championship since its establishment by the Gaelic Athletic Association in 2005. It is the third tier of hurling as of 2020.

London were scheduled to compete in the Christy Ring Cup  but didn't due to the impact of the COVID-19 pandemic on Gaelic games. The championship was scheduled to begin in May 2020 but was delayed until 24 October 2020.

The rise in COVID-19 cases affected the tournament, with two first-round games conceded due to positive tests.

Both finalists were promoted to the Joe McDonagh Cup for 2021.

The competition featured the first ever inter-county hurling penalty shootout, with Down qualifying for the final by causing an upset through knocking Offaly out in the semi-final.

Team changes

To Championship 
Relegated from the Joe McDonagh Cup

 Offaly

Promoted from the Nicky Rackard Cup

 Sligo

From Championship 
Promoted to the Joe McDonagh Cup

 Meath

Relegated to the Nicky Rackard Cup

 Donegal

Format 

Due to the COVID-19 pandemic, the normal structure of eight teams competing in two groups of four was abandoned. Seven teams competed in the 2020 Christy Ring Cup. London did not compete as the quarantine restrictions on travel meant that their participation was not feasible.

The 2020 championship had a "back-door" structure designed to ensure that each team had at least two games. Offaly and Sligo conceded their round one games due to rising cases of COVID-19 and Sligo only managed to play one game before being eliminated.

Six teams play each in the three Round 1 games. One team receives a bye to Round 2A.
The three Round 1 winners, plus the team that received a bye, play in Round 2A.
The two Round 2A winners advance to the semi-finals.
The losers of the game between a Round 1 winner and the bye-receiving team goes into Round 2B.
The three Round 1 losers and one of the Round 2A losers play in Round 2B.
The Round 2B winners advance to the semi-finals.
The semi-finals are played between the two Round 2A winners and the two Round 2B winners.
The final is between the two semi-final winners.

Round 1 
Winners advance to Round 2A. Losers advance to Round 2B.

 Down received a bye in this round.

Round 2

Round 2A 

The Round 1 winners and Down, who received a bye, competed in this round. Winners advance to Semi-Finals.

Round 2B 
The Round 1 loser and one 'lucky loser' from round 2A, Derry entered this round. Winners advance to Semi-Finals.

Semi-finals 
The Round 2A winners play the Round 2B winners. The winners advance to the final and were both promoted to the 2021 Joe McDonagh Cup.

Final 

Down and Kildare are promoted to the 2021 Joe McDonagh Cup.

Bracket 
(Incomplete)

Statistics

Top scorers

Overall

In a single game

References 

Christy Ring Cup
Christy Ring Cup
Christy Ring Cup